Philippe Martin may refer to:
Philippe-Armand Martin (born 1949), French politician representing the Marne département
Philippe Martin (politician) (born 1954), French politician representing the Gers and Landes  départements
Philippe Martin (racing driver) (born 1955), Belgian racing driver
Philippe Martin (economist)(born 1966), French economist
Philippe Martin (producer), of films such as Comme elle respire
 (?-),  Quebec actor

See also
Philip Martin (disambiguation)